Comet McNaught, also known as the Great Comet of 2007 and given the designation C/2006 P1, is a non-periodic comet discovered on 7 August 2006 by British-Australian astronomer Robert H. McNaught using the Uppsala Southern Schmidt Telescope. It was the brightest comet in over 40 years, and was easily visible to the naked eye for observers in the Southern Hemisphere in January and February 2007.

With an estimated peak magnitude of −5.5, the comet was the second-brightest since 1935. Around perihelion on 12 January, it was visible worldwide in broad daylight. Its tail measured an estimated 35 degrees in length at its peak.

The brightness of C/2006 P1 near perihelion was enhanced by forward scattering.

Discovery 
McNaught discovered the comet in a CCD image on 7 August 2006 during the course of routine observations for the Siding Spring Survey, which searched for Near-Earth Objects that might represent a collision threat to Earth. The comet was discovered in Ophiuchus, shining very dimly at a magnitude of about +17. From August through November 2006, the comet was imaged and tracked as it moved through Ophiuchus and Scorpius, brightening as high as magnitude +9, still too dim to be seen with the unaided eye. Then, for most of December, the comet was lost in the glare of the Sun.

Upon recovery, it became apparent that the comet was brightening very fast, reaching naked-eye visibility in early January 2007. It was visible to northern hemisphere observers, in Sagittarius and surrounding constellations, until about 13 January. Perihelion was 12 January at a distance of 0.17 AU. This was close enough to the Sun to be observed by the space-based Solar and Heliospheric Observatory (SOHO). The comet entered SOHO's LASCO C3 camera's field of view on 12 January, and was viewable on the web in near real-time. The comet left SOHO's field of view on 16 January. Due to its proximity to the Sun, the Northern Hemisphere ground-based viewers had a short window for viewing, and the comet could be spotted only during bright twilight.

As it reached perihelion on 12 January, it became the brightest comet since Comet Ikeya–Seki in 1965. The comet was dubbed the Great Comet of 2007 by Space.com. On 13 and 14 January 2007, the comet attained an estimated maximum apparent magnitude of −5.5. It was bright enough to be visible in daylight about 5°–10° southeast of the Sun from 12 to 14 January. Perigee (closest approach to the Earth) was 15 January 2007, at a distance of 0.82 AU.

After passing the Sun, McNaught became visible in the Southern Hemisphere. In Australia, according to Siding Spring Observatory at Coonabarabran, where the comet was discovered, it was to have reached its theoretical peak in brightness on Sunday 14 January just after sunset, when it would have been visible for 23 minutes. On 15 January the comet was observed at Perth Observatory with an estimated apparent magnitude of −4.0.

Ulysses probe 

The Ulysses spacecraft made an unexpected pass through the tail of the comet on 3 February 2007. Evidence of the encounter was published in the 1 October 2007 issue of The Astrophysical Journal. Ulysses flew through McNaught's ion tail 260 million kilometres (160 million miles) from the comet's core and instrument readings showed that there was "complex chemistry" in the region.

The Solar Wind Ion Composition Spectrometer (SWICS) aboard Ulysses measured Comet McNaught's tail composition and detected unexpected ions. It was the first time that O3+ oxygen ions were detected near a comet. This suggested that the solar wind ions, which did not originally have most of their electrons, gained some electrons while passing through the comet's atmosphere.

SWICS also measured the speed of the solar wind, and found that even at 260 million kilometres (160 million miles) from the comet's nucleus, the tail had slowed the solar wind to half its normal speed.

Prof. George Gloeckler, the principal investigator on the Solar Wind Ion Composition Spectrometer (SWICS), said the discovery was important as the composition of comets told them about conditions approximately 4.5 billion years ago when the Solar System was formed.

Period 
Comet C/2006 P1 took millions of years coming directly from the Oort cloud. It follows a hyperbolic trajectory (with an osculating eccentricity larger than 1) during its passage through the inner Solar System, but the eccentricity will drop below 1 after it leaves the influence of the planets and it will remain bound to the Solar System as an Oort cloud comet.

Given the orbital eccentricity of this object, different epochs can generate quite different heliocentric unperturbed two-body best-fit solutions to the aphelion distance (maximum distance) of this object.  For objects at such high eccentricity, the Sun's barycentric coordinates are more stable than heliocentric coordinates. Using JPL Horizons, the barycentric orbital elements for epoch 2050 generate a semi-major axis of 2050 AU and a period of approximately 92,700 years.

Gallery

See also

 Other comets with the name McNaught
 Lists of comets
 List of interstellar comets
 List of comets by type
 List of non-periodic comets
 List of periodic comets

Notes

 Solution using the Solar System Barycenter

 Read osculating orbit for more details about heliocentric unperturbed two-body solutions

References

External links 

 
 C/2006 P1 at Cometary Science Center
 Info and gallery, from skytonight
 Comet McNaught in Perth skies
 
 Current hotshots of comet, from NASA's Solar and Heliospheric Observatory website
 Animation of recent images within LASCO C3's FOV
 McNaught in STEREO HI1a
 Montage McNaught in STEREO HI1a
 Comet McNaught photo gallery from Southern Hemisphere 
 NASA Astronomy Pictures of the Day:
 5 January – Comet McNaught Heads for the Sun
 9 January – McNaught Now Brightest Comet in Decades
 13 January – Comet Over Krakow
 15 January – Comet McNaught Over Catalonia
 17 January – Comet McNaught from New STEREO Satellite
 18 January – Southern Comet
 19 January – McNaught's Matinee
 20 January – SOHO: Comet McNaught Movie
 22 January – The Magnificent Tail of Comet McNaught
 24 January – A Comet Tail Horizon
 1 February – A Tail of Two Hemispheres
 5 February – Comet Between Fireworks and Lightning
 12 February – Comet McNaught Over New Zealand

Non-periodic comets
Comets visited by spacecraft
2007 in science
20060807
Great comets
Oort cloud